INSAT-2DT, previously Arabsat-1C and also known as INSAT-2R, was a Saudi Arabian and subsequently Indian communications satellite which was operated initially by Arabsat, and then by the Indian National Satellite System.

Launch and Arabsat service
Launched in 1992 as Arabsat-1C, it was operated at 31° East longitude in geostationary orbit, from where it was used to provide communication services to the Arab States. It was constructed by Aérospatiale, based on the Spacebus 100 satellite bus, and carried two NATO E/F-band (IEEE S band) and 25 NATO G/H-Band (IEEE C band) transponders.

It was launched by Arianespace using an Ariane 4 rocket in the 44L configuration, flying from ELA-2 at the Guiana Space Centre in Kourou. The launch took place at 22:58:10 UTC on 26 February 1992. It was the final Spacebus 100 satellite to be launched.

Indian operations
In November 1997, Arabsat-1C was sold to India as INSAT-2DT. In December, it was moved to a new slot at 55°E longitude, where it replaced the INSAT-2D satellite which had failed in orbit. It remained at 55°E until August 2003, when it was moved to 85.2°E, arriving in November. By the time of its departure from 55°E, its orbital inclination had increased somewhat.

INSAT-2DT remained at 85.2°E until October 2004, when it was retired from service and placed into a graveyard orbit.

See also

1992 in spaceflight

References

INSAT satellites
Spacecraft launched in 1992
Derelict satellites orbiting Earth
1992 in India
Satellites using the Spacebus bus
Satellites of Saudi Arabia
1992 in spaceflight
1992 in Saudi Arabia